BBL Player, formerly known as BBL TV, is an English subscription-based internet television channel, operated by British Basketball League (BBL), which is available internationally through the league's official website.

History
The launch of BBL TV was first announced on 19 August 2013, after nine months of development. The online subscription-based service was scheduled to broadcast 30 live games throughout the 2013–14 season, starting with Glasgow Rocks against Surrey United on 6 October at the Emirates Arena. On top of the live broadcast's, the service included an archive library allowing viewers to watch previously broadcast games.

Due to the success and popularity of BBL TV, the service returned for the 2014–15 season with additions to the coverage including more pre and post match analysis and an 'in-play forum' allowing fans to connect and discuss the action as it happens. The number of games to be broadcast for 2014–15 was also expanded to 45 following the announcement of Sportradar as the BBL's official betting data partner for the season.

Presenters and commentators
Daniel Routledge, regular presenter and commentator
Vince Macaulay, regular commentator
Rob Paternostro, guest commentator
Mark Woods, court-side reporter

See also
British Basketball League

References

British Basketball League
Sports television in the United Kingdom
2013 establishments in the United Kingdom
Television channels and stations established in 2013
Internet television channels